No. 6 Airfield Construction Squadron (No. 6 ACS) was a Royal Australian Air Force (RAAF) construction squadron. It was formed as  No. 6 Mobile Works Squadron in December 1942 and operated in the New Guinea Campaign and Borneo Campaign during World War II. No. 6 ACS was disbanded in December 1945.

References
 
 

6
6
Airfield
Military units and formations of the Royal Australian Air Force in World War II
Military units and formations disestablished in 1945